"The Lord of the Tides" is the eighth episode of the first season of the HBO fantasy drama television series House of the Dragon. It first aired on October 9, 2022. It was written by Eileen Shim, and directed by Geeta Vasant Patel.

The episode features a 6-year time jump after the previous episode and depicts the discussion in King's Landing regarding Lord Corlys Velaryon's successor as "the Lord of the Tides", initiated by his brother Ser Vaemond Velaryon's disapproval of the previously-approved successor, Corlys' grandson, Lucerys; King Viserys' deteriorating health leading to his death; and the announcement of the betrothals of Jacaerys Velaryon and Baela Targaryen as well as Lucerys Velaryon and Rhaena Targaryen.

It received highly positive reviews from critics, particularly for its direction, writing, pacing, and performances of the cast, especially Paddy Considine, who was considered the highlight of the episode.

Plot
Six years have passed, and House Velaryon's succession is jeopardized when Corlys Velaryon, Lord of the Tides, is severely wounded in the Stepstones fighting the Triarchy. His brother, Ser Vaemond Velaryon, petitions King's Landing to be named Corlys' heir, proclaiming that Prince Lucerys is not Ser Laenor Velaryon's legitimate son. A pregnant Princess Rhaenyra and Prince Daemon return to the capital to defend Lucerys' claim. Upon arrival, Rhaenyra notices the Red Keep is now austere and grim, reflecting the new religion that Queen Alicent embraces. King Viserys, bedridden, disfigured, and mentally muddled is gladdened to meet Rhaenyra and Daemon's sons Aegon the Younger and Viserys the Younger. All royal matters are now overseen by Alicent and the King's Hand, Ser Otto Hightower, who keep Viserys quiescent with milk of the poppy.

Meanwhile, Talya, Alicent's lady-in-waiting, frequently visits Daemon's former mistress, Mysaria, believed to be the White Worm, providing information regarding the royals.

Prince Aegon, now married to his sister, Helaena, rapes a handmaiden, which Alicent later covers up. In an attempt to gain Princess Rhaenys' support, Rhaenyra proposes that her son, Prince Jacaerys, marry Rhaenys' granddaughter, Lady Baela, who would eventually rule as king and queen-consort, as well as a marriage between Lucerys and Baela's twin sister, Lady Rhaena, she becoming the Lady of Driftmark and continuing the true Velaryon name and bloodline. Rhaenys warns her that she will have to stand alone while expecting the Hightowers to rule in favour of Vaemond. She also pleads for Viserys to defend her succession to the throne, quoting Aegon the Conqueror's prophetic dream about the Prince That Was Promised. 

Vaemond presents his petition to the court, where Otto seems prepared to rule against Lucerys. As Rhaenyra begins speaking, Viserys, frail and barely ambulatory, enters, shocking the court. Viserys struggles towards the Iron Throne, but is assisted by Daemon, who returns Viserys’ crown to his head, it having fallen off on the stairs. Viserys asks for Rhaenys’ opinion on the matter, and she replies that Corlys wishes for Luke to succeed him as Lord of The Tides. Viserys then affirms that Lucerys is the legitimate heir to Driftmark. Enraged, Vaemond calls Rhaenyra a whore, and his supposed nephews and Rhaenyra’s three elder sons bastards; Viserys declares that he will have Vaemond’s tongue, keeping to his declaration in Driftmark that anyone who dares question the parentage of Rhaenyra’s sons would lose their tongue. Daemon then decapitates Vaemond, declaring that he can keep his tongue.

The royal families gather for a feast at which Viserys implores everyone to make amends. In response, Rhaenyra toasts Queen Alicent for lovingly caring for Viserys. Alicent, in turn, toasts Rhaenyra, and - still angry with Aegon - says she will make a fine queen. After the exhausted king retires to bed, Aemond abruptly ends the festivities by mockingly praising Jacaerys, Lucerys, and Joffrey as being three "Strong boys", alluding to their deceased, biological father, Ser Harwin Strong. This results in a fight among the princes. Amid mounting royal tensions, Rhaenyra prepares for her family's return to Dragonstone. Viserys, on his deathbed, mistakes Alicent for Rhaenyra and mutters parts of Aegon the Conqueror's dream; Alicent misinterprets it as Viserys wanting their son, Aegon, to succeed him as king. Viserys calls out to his "love", his late wife Aemma, as he passes away.

Production

Writing and filming 
"The Lord of the Tides" was directed by Geeta Vasant Patel and written by Eileen Shim, marking their first time in the Game of Thrones franchise.

The title of the episode refers to the title held by Lord Corlys Velaryon as the episode focuses on the discussion of his successor.

Casting 
The episode stars Paddy Considine, Matt Smith, Olivia Cooke, Emma D'Arcy, Rhys Ifans, Eve Best, Fabien Frankel, Sonoya Mizuno, Graham McTavish, Jefferson Hall, Harry Collett, Tom Glynn-Carney, Ewan Mitchell, Bethany Antonia, Phoebe Campbell, and Phia Saban. It marks the first appearance of Glynn-Carney as adult Aegon Targaryen, Saban as adult Helaena Targaryen, Mitchell as adult Aemond Targaryen, Collett as adult Jacaerys Velaryon, Elliot Grihault as adult Lucerys Velaryon, Antonia as adult Baela Targaryen, and Campbell as adult Rhaena Targaryen, succeeding Ty Tennant, Evie Allen, Leo Ashton, Leo Hart, Harvey Sadler, Shani Smethurst and Eva Ossei-Gerning who portrayed the young version of the seven characters, respectively, in the sixth and seventh episodes, following a plot jump of six years after the previous episode. Of the seven actors, Grihault was the only one not featured in the opening credits, but instead in the closing credits. In addition, it also marks the final appearance of Wil Johnson as Ser Vaemond Velaryon.

Reception

Ratings
An estimated 1.73 million viewers watched "The Lord of the Tides" during its first broadcast on HBO. Around 2.4 million viewers watched the episode across its four broadcasts during its premiere night.

Critical response

The episode received  highly positive reviews from critics. On the review aggregator Rotten Tomatoes, it holds an approval rating of 91% based on 34 reviews, with an average rating of 7.3/10. The website's critical consensus said, "The family comes together for a short-lived truce in 'The Lord of the Tides,' a mournful installment that spotlights Paddy Considine's moving performance as the ailing King Viserys." It received an "amazing" score of 9 out of 10 from Helen O'Hara of IGN, a rating of 4.5 out of 5 stars from Alec Bojalad of Den of Geek, and an "A-" grade from Jenna Scherer of The A.V. Club. In her review, O'Hara noted it as "a smart, well-written, and character-driven episode that once again shifts the show forward in time without entirely losing the plot." Bojalad called it "an exciting [and] effective episode of television." Scherer deemed it "the series' best episode to date." 

Considine's performance was singled out by many critics as the highlight of the episode. Oliver Vandervoort of Game Rant said that he "does a phenomenal job of playing someone who knows that his days are growing short and who just wants to take in his family." Additionally, Bojalad called the performance "transcendent", while Scherer considered it Emmy-worthy. TVLine named Considine the "Performer of the Week" for his performance in this episode for the week of October 15, 2022. The site wrote, "Considine's excellent turn as the decrepit royal in his final days will live in perpetuity. [...] [His] genius lay in the way he allowed Viserys' physical decline to be the catalyst for the king's emotionally stripped-down plea to his fractured family. [...]  So many props to Considine for making the conflicted, complicated man someone on whose words we hung until the very end."

Several critics highlighted Viserys' speech during the family dinner at the Red Keep. Daniel Van Boom of CNET said that it was "a great speech" and his presence was "classic Game of Thrones quality stuff." Furthermore, the dinner scene itself also received praise. Bojalad named it "[the series'] finest hour, and maybe one of the best scenes ever in the Game of Thrones franchise." The scene in the Great Hall when Viserys walked across the room to reach the Iron Throne was also praised, with Scherer saying, "Viserys' slow, agonizing journey across the throne room makes for a stunning set piece, richly earned by all the episodes we've spent watching him waffle and demure in the face of high stakes." In addition, critics also praised Patel's direction, Shim's writing, Cooke and D'Arcy's on-screen chemistry, and the performances of Best, Cooke, D'Arcy, Mitchell, and Smith.

"The Lord of the Tides" was included in many publications' list of the best TV episode of 2022. Mashable named it the third best TV episode of the year. British GQ ranked it the fourth best episode of the year and wrote, "This was the episode in which House of the Dragon finally proved its worth, paying off the ruthless politicking of the season before it in spades, elevated by an all-timer of a performance from Paddy Considine." Meanwhile, Decider and Entertainment Weekly listed the episode in their respective unranked list.

References

External links
 "The Lord of the Tides" at HBO
 

2022 American television episodes
House of the Dragon episodes